The 2014 Elimination Chamber (known as No Escape in Germany) was the fifth Elimination Chamber professional wrestling pay-per-view (PPV) event produced by WWE. The event took place on February 23, 2014, at the Target Center in Minneapolis, Minnesota. It was WWE's final PPV to air before the launch of their online streaming service, the WWE Network, on February 24; following its launch, the events began to be simultaneously broadcast on PPV and livestreamed on the WWE Network.

Eight matches took place at the event, including one on the Kickoff pre-show. In the main event, Randy Orton retained the WWE World Heavyweight Championship in an Elimination Chamber match, defeating John Cena, Daniel Bryan, Christian, Cesaro, and Sheamus.

The event had 183,000 buys, down from previous year's 213,000 buys.

Production

Background
Elimination Chamber is a gimmick pay-per-view (PPV) produced every February by WWE since 2010. The concept of the show is that one or two main event matches are contested inside the Elimination Chamber, either with championships or future opportunities at championships at stake. The 2014 event was the fifth event under the Elimination Chamber chronology and was scheduled to be held on February 23, 2014, at the Target Center in Minneapolis, Minnesota.

In 2011 and since 2013, the show has been promoted as "No Escape" in Germany as it was feared that the name "Elimination Chamber" may remind people of the gas chambers used during the Holocaust.

Storylines
The card consisted of eight matches, including one on the Kickoff pre-show, that resulted from scripted storylines, where wrestlers portrayed heroes,  villains, or less distinguishable characters in scripted events that built tension and culminated in a wrestling match or series of matches. Results were predetermined by WWE's writers, while storylines were produced on WWE's weekly television programs, Raw and SmackDown.

The main event was the Elimination Chamber match, where Randy Orton defended the WWE World Heavyweight Championship against five wrestlers after retaining it at the Royal Rumble from John Cena. The night after the Rumble on Raw, Daniel Bryan confronted The Authority for keeping him out of the Rumble match. Stephanie McMahon claimed they didn't want to overwork him with two matches in a night, but Bryan concluded they disliked him due to his popularity. He demanded Triple H put him in the Elimination Chamber title match. Triple H sent in The Shield (Roman Reigns, Seth Rollins, and United States Champion Dean Ambrose) to attack Bryan, but Cena and Sheamus saved him. This set up an Elimination Chamber qualifying match between those three and The Shield. During the match, The Wyatt Family (Bray Wyatt, Luke Harper, and Erick Rowan) attacked Cena, giving his team a disqualification win, meaning Cena, Sheamus, and Bryan all qualified for the Chamber match. On the January 31 episode of SmackDown, Cesaro defeated Dolph Ziggler to qualify, and his partner Jack Swagger lost his qualifier to a returning Christian. On the February 3 episode of Raw, Stephanie McMahon would mandate Randy Orton to compete in a Elimination Chamber Gauntlet where he must face each of his Chamber opponents in single matches. He was defeated by Daniel Bryan that same night, but secured a win by defeating Christian on the February 7 episode of SmackDown.  He then was defeated by Cena on the February 10 episode of Raw and by Cesaro on the February 14 episode of SmackDown. His last opponent, Sheamus, won by disqualification, as The Shield and The Wyatt Family got involved on the February 17 episode of Raw.

On the January 31 episode of SmackDown, The Shield (Roman Reigns, Seth Rollins, and Dean Ambrose) refused Triple H's request for the group to drop the matter of The Wyatt Family (Bray Wyatt, Luke Harper, and Erick Rowan) disqualifying them from the Chamber match, so a six-man tag team match between the two teams was scheduled for Elimination Chamber.

After Batista's WWE return was announced in December, Alberto Del Rio began saying fans should talk about him instead and vowed to eliminate Batista from the Royal Rumble match. On the January 20 episode of Raw, following a victory over Rey Mysterio, Del Rio was attacked by Batista and hit with his finishing move the Batista Bomb. Del Rio entered the Rumble at number 27 and lasted just under three minutes before Batista, who was the next entrant, eliminated him. On the February 3 episode of Raw, Batista was interrupted and briefly assaulted by Del Rio, however the latter quickly escaped the ring. On the next Raw, after Del Rio defeated Dolph Ziggler, Batista came out and delivered a Batista Bomb to Del Rio through the announce table. Triple H then announced the two would wrestle at Elimination Chamber.

On the February 13 episode of SmackDown, Jack Swagger defeated Mark Henry, Rey Mysterio, and Kofi Kingston in a fatal four-way match to become the number one contender for the Intercontinental Championship, and would wrestle champion Big E for the title at the pay-per-view.

On WWE.com, it was announced The Usos (Jimmy Uso and Jey Uso) would face WWE Tag Team Champions The New Age Outlaws (Road Dogg and Billy Gunn) for the titles at the pay-per-view. This was made when The Usos asked the Outlaws to fight for the championship for the following weeks. Then, they accepted the challenge.

Former Prime Time Players tag team members Titus O'Neil and Darren Young were scheduled for a match at Elimination Chamber. The feud began on the January 31 episode of SmackDown, when O'Neil attacked Young after a tag team loss by the Prime Time Players, with O'Neil claiming that Young was "dead weight" and "holding him back".

The Elimination Chamber Kickoff Show saw Cody Rhodes and Goldust squaring off against RybAxel (Ryback and Curtis Axel).

Event

Pre-show 
During the Elimination Chamber Kickoff pre-show, Cody Rhodes and Goldust faced RybAxel (Ryback and Curtis Axel). Rhodes executed Cross Rhodes on Axel to win the match.

Preliminary matches
The actual pay-per-view opened with Big E defending the Intercontinental Championship against Jack Swagger. In the end, Swagger applied a Patriot Lock on Big E, but Big E performed an Enziguiri on Swagger to break the hold and executed a Big Ending on Swagger to retain the title.

Next, The New Age Outlaws (Road Dogg and Billy Gunn) defended the WWE Tag Team Championship against The Usos (Jimmy Uso and Jey Uso). The ending saw Jimmy perform a Superkick on Road Dogg, causing him to fall off the apron. Gunn pinned Jimmy with a roll-up to retain the titles.

After that, Titus O'Neil faced Darren Young. O'Neil executed a Clash of the Titus on Young to win the match.

In the fourth match, The Shield (United States Champion Dean Ambrose, Seth Rollins, and Roman Reigns) faced The Wyatt Family (Bray Wyatt, Luke Harper, and Erick Rowan). During the match, Ambrose fought with Wyatt into the arena stands, taking Ambrose out of the match. Harper and Rowan executed a double Chokeslam through a broadcast table on Rollins. In the climax, Reigns attempted a Spear on Wyatt, but Harper stood in the way and received a Spear from Reigns. Wyatt executed Sister Abigail on Reigns to win the match.

Next, AJ Lee defended the WWE Divas Championship against Cameron. Cameron won by disqualification after Tamina Snuka attacked her with a Clothesline, meaning AJ retained the title.

In the penultimate match, Batista faced Alberto Del Rio. In the closing moments, Del Rio attempted to apply the Cross Armbreaker on Batista, but Batista pushed Del Rio into an exposed turnbuckle and executed a Batista Bomb on Del Rio to win the match.

Main event
The main event was the Elimination Chamber match for the WWE World Heavyweight Championship. John Cena entered at #1 Christian entered at #2. Randy Orton entered at #3, Daniel Bryan entered at #4, Cesaro entered at #5, and Sheamus entered at #6. With Sheamus and Cesaro starting the match and still in the ring, Daniel Bryan was the first to be released from his pod. Christian was next to be released from his pod. Next to be released is John Cena. Orton being the last to be released and making all 6 men still in the match. After making a few moves on the other 5 men, they all got up and backed Orton into a corner. Orton then locked himself in his pod but Sheamus executed a Brogue Kick into the plexi-glass breaking the plexi-glass open and attacking Orton. Sheamus was eliminated by Christian after a Frog Splash off the top of a pod. Christian was eliminated by Bryan after a Running Knee. Cesaro was eliminated by Cena after submitting to the STF. The Wyatt Family (Bray Wyatt, Luke Harper, and Erick Rowan) interfered in the match, attacking Bryan and Cena. After Wyatt performed Sister Abigail on Cena, Orton pinned Cena to eliminate him. Bryan climbed to the top rope and jumped Kane (DoO, wrestler) who came and assisted with removing The Wyatt Family from the chamber, Orton took advantage of Bryan being distracted to try and eliminate him. Bryan got Orton with a running knee and almost had the win but Kane pulled the referee out of the ring in the middle of the 3 count. Bryan kicked Kane in the head, and Orton executed an RKO to eliminate Bryan but he kicked out at a 2 count. Kane hit Bryan then Orton executed another RKO to eliminate him and retain the WWE World Heavyweight Championship.

Aftermath
Batista and Alberto Del Rio faced each other in a rematch with Del Rio prevailing due to Randy Orton distracting Batista. Orton then mentioned the boisterous negative reaction since Batista's return. Batista responded by saying that the WWE Universe has their own voice. Later on, however, Batista addressed the crowd, telling them he did not return to the company to be liked, only to win the championship, thus turning into a villain in the process.

Daniel Bryan confronted Triple H arguing about constantly getting screwed in his title matches ever since SummerSlam and challenged him to a match at WrestleMania XXX, but the latter declined. Later that night, Bryan defeated Kane, and after the match, Bryan voiced his opinion to Triple H by stating he should give what the fans want. Bryan challenged Triple H on the March 3 episode of Raw, but Triple H still declined. Frustrated, Bryan conjured up the Yes! Movement on the March 10 episode of Raw, involving WWE fans which gathered around the ring, and forced Triple H to accepting his match with the stipulation that if Bryan defeated Triple H, he would get inserted into the WWE World Heavyweight Championship match. On the March 17 episode of Raw, the stipulation was changed where instead the winner would advance to the main event for the title, thus assuring a triple threat match.

John Cena would call out The Wyatt Family (Bray Wyatt, Luke Harper, and Erick Rowan), only to be attacked by Wyatt. On the March 10 episode of Raw, when Hulk Hogan announced the André the Giant Memorial Battle Royal at WrestleMania XXX with Cena at first entering himself as the first entrant, only for the Wyatt Family to interrupt, insinuating that Hogan and Cena's heroic persona's are facades and that Bray is the "truth". Cena would then instead challenge Bray to a one-on-one match at WrestleMania with his legacy on the line, which Wyatt accepted.

The Usos (Jey Uso and Jimmy Uso) defeated The New Age Outlaws (Road Dogg and Billy Gunn) in a non-title match to ensure their spot again for the tag team titles. On the March 3 episode of Raw, The Usos finally defeated them to capture their first WWE Tag Team Championship.

Darren Young defeated Titus O'Neil in a rematch on the February 26 episode of Main Event.

Cameron got a rematch for the WWE Divas Championship on the following SmackDown against AJ Lee, but she failed to win the championship cleanly this time.

Elimination Chamber would mark as the final PPV in-ring competition event for Christian until Royal Rumble 2021 where he made a surprise return as the number 24 entrant. On the March 24 episode of Raw, Christian won a fatal four-way match which included Alberto Del Rio, Dolph Ziggler, and Sheamus to challenge Big E for the WWE Intercontinental Championship but never happened due to Christian suffering a mild concussion. This led to Christian making part-time non-wrestling appearances on pre-shows and podcasts without any news regarding his career in wrestling. On October 27, 2015, Christian's profile was moved from the superstar section to the alumni section on WWE.com, noting Christian's retirement from professional wrestling with the company.

The following year's Elimination Chamber was originally scheduled to be a house show, a wrestling show that is not televised, but it was announced during the May 11, 2015, episode of Raw that Elimination Chamber would return on May 31. The event was initially replaced in February by Fastlane because many arenas were not able to physically support the Elimination Chamber structure, thus making it easier to book the February pay-per-view event without the structure. It was also the first Elimination Chamber to stream on WWE's online streaming service, the WWE Network, which launched the day after the 2014 event.

The 2014 Elimination Chamber was the last WWE PPV held, as well as the last WWE event held, before the WWE Network was launched the next day. As such, the events began to be simultaneously broadcast on PPV and livestreamed on the WWE Network.

Results

Elimination Chamber entrances and eliminations

References

Note

External links
Official Elimination Chamber website

2014 in Minnesota
Events in Minneapolis
2014
Professional wrestling in Minneapolis
2014 WWE pay-per-view events
February 2014 events in the United States